Hand House may refer to:

Hand House (Shubata, Mississippi), listed on the NRHP in Mississippi
Walter Hand House, Cornwall, NY, listed on the NRHP in New York
Ross-Hand Mansion, South Nyack, NY, listed on the NRHP in New York
Elias Hand House, Mountainville, NY, listed on the NRHP in New York
Hand House, Elizabethtown, New York, listed on the NRHP in New York
Gen. Edward Hand House, Lancaster, PA, listed on the NRHP in Pennsylvania